Coleophora niveiciliella is a moth of the family Coleophoridae. It is found in France, Austria, Slovakia and Hungary.

The larvae feed on the leaves of Inula conyza.

References

niveiciliella
Moths described in 1877
Moths of Europe